Geach is a surname. Notable people with the surname include:

Carveth Geach (1928–2005), Chief Scout of the Boy Scouts of South Africa
Peter Geach (1916–2013), British philosopher and professor
Portia Geach (1973–1959), Australian artist and feminist
Trevor Geach (1928–1996), South African cricketer